The Heart of Me is the twelfth studio album by Christian singer-songwriter Kathy Troccoli. It was released on September 24, 2002, by Reunion Records. The album earned Troccoli her third Grammy nomination (her first since 1988) for Best Pop/Contemporary Gospel Album at the 45th Grammy Awards. The Heart of Me debuted and peaked at number 37 on the Billboard Top Christian Albums chart.

Track listing 

Note: (*) - tracks produced by Christopher Harris; all remaining tracks produced by Nathan DiGesare.

Critical reception 

Trevor Kirk of Cross Rhythms rated The Heart of Me 9 out of 10 saying that "throughout the album, every song is a strong one. Kathy has several songwriting credits, notably on 'Heaven Knows' and the closer, 'You're Still God,' a five minute-plus paean of praise to her Saviour. Definitely recommended."

Charts

Radio singles

References 

2002 albums
Kathy Troccoli albums
Reunion Records albums